John Bonham (1948–1980) was an English drummer.

John Bonham may also refer to:

John Bonham (mercer), British soldier and mercer in the 13th and/or 14th centuries
John Bonham (MP) (c. 1524–1555), for Chippenham
John Bonham (rugby league) (born 1948), Australian rugby league player

See also

John Bonham-Carter (disambiguation)